Zbigniew Syka (24 March 1936 – 2 August 1996) was a Polish sprinter. He competed in the men's 100 metres at the 1964 Summer Olympics.

References

1936 births
1996 deaths
Athletes (track and field) at the 1964 Summer Olympics
Polish male sprinters
Olympic athletes of Poland
Sportspeople from Bydgoszcz
Zawisza Bydgoszcz athletes